Midas Touch or the Midas Touch may refer to:

 Midas touch, in Greek myth, in which King Midas turned anything he touched to gold.

Film
 The Midas Touch (1940 film), a British thriller film
 Eldorado (1988 film), also known as The Midas Touch, a Hungarian drama film
 The Midas Touch (1997 film), an independent fantasy film
 The Midas Touch (2013 film), a Hong Kong comedy film

Literature
 Midas Touch (book), a 2011 book by Donald Trump and Robert Kiyosaki
 The Midas Touch (novel), a 1938 novel by Margaret Kennedy
 "The Midas Touch", A 1961 Magica De Spell story in the Scrooge McDuck universe
 "The Midas Touch", Green Arrow Volume 1 in DC Comics; see list of The New 52 publications

Music
 "The Midas Touch", a 1980 album by Michael Marra
 Midas Touch, a 2010 album by Peter Howarth
 Midas Touch: The Very Best of The Hollies, a compilation album by The Hollies
 "The Midas Touch", a song from the 1956 musical Bells Are Ringing
 "Midas Touch", a song by Saxon on the 1983 album Power & the Glory
 "Midas Touch", a song by Midnight Star on the 1986 album Headlines
 Midas Touch Organ Duo, Roger Sayer and Charles Andrews
 "Midas Touch", a song by Aurora

Television
 "Midas Touch", an episode of The New Avengers (TV series)
 "The Midas Touch", an episode of The Peter Principle (TV series)
 "The Midas Touch", an episode of Terrahawks

Other
 Midas Touch Golden Elixir, a beer produced by Dogfish Head Brewery
 Midas Touch, a racehorse which came fifth in the 2010 Epsom Derby
 MeidasTouch, an American political action committee